Richard Broun may refer to:

Richard Broun (politician), see Members of the Western Australian Legislative Council, 1832–1870
Sir Richard Broun, 6th Baronet (died 1781), of the Broun baronets
Sir Richard Broun, 8th Baronet (1801–1858), of the Broun baronets

See also
Richard Brown (disambiguation)
Broun (surname)